Anjou may refer to:

Geography and titles

France 
County of Anjou, a historical county in France and predecessor of the Duchy of Anjou
Count of Anjou, title of nobility
Duchy of Anjou, a historical duchy and later a province of France
Duke of Anjou, title of nobility
 Anjou, Isère, a commune

Other countries 
 Anjou, Quebec, Canada, a borough of Montreal
 Anjou (electoral district)
 Anjou Islands, a group of the New Siberian Islands

Food 
 Anjou (grape), another name for the French wine grape Chenin blanc
 Anjou wine, a wine region in the Loire Valley
 D'Anjou or Anjou pear

Other uses 
 Anjou (ship), wrecked in 1905

See also
 Angevin (disambiguation), meaning "of Anjou"
 Anjo (disambiguation)
 Anju (disambiguation)